Prospect High School may refer to:

 Prospect High School (Saratoga, California)
 Prospect High School (Illinois)
 Prospect Charter School, Prospect, Oregon
 Prospect High School (Oroville, California)
 Prospect High School (Launceston, Tasmania)